Volodymyr Arzhanov (born 29 November 1985) is a Ukrainian retired football midfielder.

Career
In January 2015, Arzhanov signed for FC Atyrau in the Kazakhstan Premier League.

See also
 2005 FIFA World Youth Championship squads#Ukraine

References

External links

1985 births
Living people
Footballers from Zaporizhzhia
Ukrainian footballers
Ukraine under-21 international footballers
Ukraine youth international footballers
Ukrainian expatriate footballers
Association football midfielders
FC Metalurh Zaporizhzhia players
FC Metalurh-2 Zaporizhzhia players
FC Arsenal Kyiv players
FC Volyn Lutsk players
FC Chornomorets Odesa players
FC Atyrau players
Ukrainian Premier League players
Ukrainian First League players
Ukrainian Second League players
Ukrainian Amateur Football Championship players
Kazakhstan Premier League players
Expatriate footballers in Kazakhstan
Ukrainian expatriate sportspeople in Kazakhstan
FC Kaisar players
FC Viktoriya Mykolaivka players